Self-portrait at an Easel is a c.1556-1565 oil on canvas painting by Sofonisba Anguissola, now in Łańcut Castle. From the same era as Self-Portrait at a Spinet (Naples) it shows the artist painting a devotional canvas and is one of a group of self-portraits which also includes Self-Portrait (Vienna) and Miniature Self Portrait (Boston).

References

Anguissola
Anguissola
Self
1550s paintings
1560s paintings
Paintings in Poland